Trujillanos Fútbol Club is a Venezuelan football team playing at the top level, the Primera División Venezolana. It is based in Valera.  Their home stadium is Estadio Luis Loreto Lira.

At the end of the 2006–2007 season Trujillanos finished in the relegation places but the club won a reprieve when the Primera División Venezolana decided to expand from 10 to 18 teams, thus allowing the two teams in the relegation places to remain in the league.

Honours
Primera División Venezolana: 1
Apertura 2014

Segunda División Venezolana: 1
1988–89

Copa de Venezuela: 2
1992, 2010

Performance in CONMEBOL competitions
Copa Libertadores: 3 appearances
1995: First Round
2002: Preliminary Round
2016: Group Stage

Copa Sudamericana: 5 appearances
2005: Second Preliminary Round
2010: First Round
2011: Second Round
2013: First Round
2014: First Round

Current first team squad

References

External links
Official site
Fan site

Football clubs in Venezuela
Association football clubs established in 1981
Trujillo (state)
1981 establishments in Venezuela